Neoptychodes cosmeticus is a species of beetle in the family Cerambycidae. It was described by Martins and Galileo in 1996. It is known from Ecuador and Colombia.

References

Lamiini
Beetles described in 1996